Music in Manhattan is a 1944 American musical film directed by John H. Auer. The film was nominated for an Academy Award for Best Sound Recording (Stephen Dunn).

Cast
 Anne Shirley as Frankie Foster
 Dennis Day as Stanley Benson
 Phillip Terry as Johnny Pearson
 Raymond Walburn as Professor Carl Roberti
 Jane Darwell as Mrs. Pearson

References

External links
 

1944 films
1944 musical films
American musical films
1940s English-language films
American black-and-white films
Films directed by John H. Auer
Films scored by Leigh Harline
1940s American films